Gunnersbury Triangle is a  local nature reserve in Chiswick, in the London boroughs of Ealing and Hounslow, immediately to the east of Gunnersbury. It was created in 1983 when, for the first time in Britain, a public inquiry ruled that a planned development of the land could not go ahead because of its value for nature. It opened as a nature reserve in 1985.

The area consists mainly of secondary birch woodland, with some locally uncommon willow carr or wet woodland and a small area of acid grassland along the track of the former Acton curve railway. The reserve supports a varied population of plants, birds, amphibians, insects and other wildlife. It is managed by the London Wildlife Trust.

The reserve is maintained by London Wildlife Trust staff with the help of volunteers, and is open to the public. There is a varied programme of activities including wildlife walks, fungus forays, open days and talks. The reserve is used regularly by school and community groups, and for team-building work days by corporate groups. Its entrance, with a wooden five-bar gate flanked by hedges, is on the south of Bollo Lane, a few yards from Chiswick Park Underground station.

History

The area is shown on 19th-century maps as orchards and gravel quarries. The triangular area now occupied by the reserve was delineated by three railway lines, two belonging to the District Railway (now the District line of London Underground), and one to the now-defunct London and South Western Railway (LSWR). There was once a bridge into the triangle from the west, and in the 1940s it was used as railway allotments (vegetable gardens), but when London Transport's Acton Works was built, the bridge was abandoned. The area, thus disused, was colonised naturally by grasses and trees in a "secondary succession".

In 1981, the site was proposed for commercial development, provoking an energetic campaign by the Chiswick Wildlife Group, formed in March 1982, which became the local branch of the London Wildlife Trust. The threat to the site was one of the first to be highlighted by the London Wildlife Trust on its formation in October 1981. The campaign led to a Public Inquiry in July 1983, which determined that the site should be devoted to nature conservation. This was the first time anywhere in the United Kingdom that a Public Inquiry had ruled in favour of nature in a city, and the Gunnersbury Triangle example became a test case.

According to the New Scientist, writing in 1985, "the celebrated Gunnersbury Triangle – an undisturbed piece of woodland surrounded by railways including the District Line ... was bought and preserved by Hounslow borough from British Rail with a GLC grant of £58 000. The GLC also gave expert ecological advice when Hounslow council contested a public inquiry to save the Triangle."

The London Wildlife Trust has managed the Gunnersbury Triangle on behalf of the London Borough of Hounslow since 1985. The London Borough of Hounslow formally designated the Gunnersbury Triangle as a local nature reserve in 1987. The London Borough of Ealing formally designated the part of the Gunnersbury Triangle that lies in Ealing as a local nature reserve in 1991.

In 1993, recalling the dramatic events, the president of the London Natural History Society, David Bevan said:

Bevan quoted Goode as saying "It had none of the features which, in traditional nature conservation terms, would make it a place worth preserving", going on to explain this remark as follows:

In 2016, the Triangle's volunteers won an RE:LEAF Acorn Award for their "particular contribution to promoting or conserving trees".

Reserve

Gunnersbury Triangle is a classic "railway triangle", the  space in between three curving railway lines. To the west is the Richmond branch of the London Overground; to the south, the District line; and to the northeast, the disused track of the London and South Western Railway (there remains the Piccadilly line a little further north, crossing Bollo lane). Much of the area is now wooded. It is a local nature reserve and a Site of Metropolitan Importance for Nature Conservation.

Habitats

The following compartments are identified in the reserve's management plan:

 Compartment 1: Secondary birch woodland
 This covers most of the reserve. Silver birch is dominant, with a few crack willow, goat willow, some wild cherry and sycamore in the canopy. Shrubs include hawthorn, elder, holly, yew and rowan, with garden escapes like buddleia, Oregon grape, cotoneaster, privet. There are some saplings of pedunculate oak, mostly around the edge, and holm oak. The field layer is mainly thick bramble, with ivy in denser shade. Ferns include male fern, broad buckler fern and the less common lady fern.
 Compartment 2: Secondary willow woodland
 Willow carr (locally uncommon wet woodland including the "mangrove swamp") with goat willow, grey willow, and some crack willow, with hybrids. The shrubs and field layer are similar to compartment 1; there is some honeysuckle and common horsetail, hemlock water-dropwort, gypsywort, yellow flag, pendulous sedge.
 Compartment 3: Eastern bank and hedgerow
 Rough grassland with false oat-grass, Yorkshire fog, yarrow, cat's ear, with bracken at the south end. There is an uneven hedge of hawthorn and buckthorn. The sunny south-west aspect encourages butterflies including holly blue, Essex skipper and small skipper.
 Compartment 4: North neutral meadow (anthill meadow)
 Very uneven meadow with mounds formed by the yellow meadow ant Lasius flavus, fox earths, and spoil dumped during former gravel works. Grasses especially false oat-grass, Yorkshire fog; also cock's-foot, common bent and sheep's fescue. Herbs include common vetch, meadow vetchling, white clover, yarrow, ribwort plantain.
 Compartment 5: North acid meadow (railway track acid grassland)
 On the former Acton curve railway, with a substratum of gritty sand and ballast (hard acidic rock). Small fine grasses especially sheep's fescue, with fine-leaved sheep's fescue, hard fescue, squirrel-tail fescue, early hair-grass. Herbs include sheep's sorrel, mouse-eared hawkweed, cat's ear and yarrow.
 Compartment 6: Southwest meadow (picnic meadow)
 Coarse grasses such as cocksfoot, Yorkshire fog, false oat-grass, annual meadow-grass. Broom has colonised on the site of an accidental fire.

 Compartment 7: Main pond
 Main pond, dug in 1986, with seasonally fluctuating water levels. Most vegetation has colonised naturally, with among others common reed, purple loosestrife, yellow iris, water-plantain, water figwort, soft rush, gypsywort, water starwort, curled pondweed, common duckweed, water forget-me-not, water mint, brooklime.

 Compartment 8: Small pond
 Seasonal pond with water plantain, celery-leaved crowfoot, bittersweet, water figwort, and introduced yellow iris.
 Compartment 9: Tall herb meadow (beside ramp path from entrance)
 Small meadow of tall ruderal herbs, changing with natural succession, held back by cutting, with plants such as cow parsley, hogweed, stinging nettle, false oat-grass, garden escape daffodils and irises.
 Compartment 10: Gardens
 Entrance yard gardens sown with wild flowers; hedge mustard, hoary mustard and other ruderal species invading; hedges with native trees and shrubs; hops scramble up the hedges.
 Compartment 11: Infrastructure
 Hut, sheds.

Usage

The Gunnersbury Triangle is regularly visited by school parties, totalling some 1500 students per year, mainly in the summer when they can work outside. They study grassland, woodland and pond ecology.

According to the TES magazine, "From April, holly blue, peacock and brimstone butterflies abound. Following the illustrated guide, you wind among wild cherry and rowan, under archways of hazel branches to a pond where damsel-flies dance in early summer. A sparrow-hawk nests in a silver birch, a jay comes visiting, bees and wood-mice also live here." The TES continues: "There are open glades for picnics and, in autumn, blackberries to gather. The aim here is to manage the woodland as a natural piece of countryside in town, and if, from time to time, you glimpse a tube train, you hardly notice it, beyond the trees."

The reserve is open to the public. The London Wildlife Trust runs guided visits such as Fungus Forays and wildlife walks every year. On open days, staff and volunteers organise activities to enable children and adults to learn more about nature conservation in a relaxed environment.

From time to time, companies provide teams of volunteers to work for a day on tasks such as clearing scrub and repairing paths and fences.

The London Wildlife Trust's long-term management objective for the site is "to manage the nature reserve to conserve its natural biodiversity, and to conserve its matrix of woodland, wetland and grassland habitats through appropriate management", which includes coppicing, clearing scrub, mowing, and controlling invasion by non-native species, while "preserving the feeling of 'wilderness'".

Value

The Mayor of London's 2002 Biodiversity Strategy comments "Over the last few decades, many exciting places have been established where city people are able to enjoy the natural world, often on sites which at the outset had seemingly little to offer. These include Camley Street Natural Park in King's Cross, Gillespie Park in Highbury, Gunnersbury Triangle in Chiswick, ..." and explains "The important message conveyed by these projects, regardless of their size, is that significant achievements for nature conservation are possible even in the most urban of settings, and often on modest budgets, provided there exists a cocktail of goodwill, optimism, commitment and professional back-up. Moreover such projects often yield social benefits, providing a community focus."

Biodiversity
These photographs, all taken in the Gunnersbury Triangle nature reserve, illustrate a little of its biodiversity.

Animals

Fungi

Plants

Activities 
These photographs illustrate some of the educational and conservation activity on the reserve.

Conservation

Education and public outreach

Notes

References

Sources

 Anon. Gunnersbury Triangle Summary Management Plan 2005–2010. London Wildlife Trust. June 2008.
 
 Goode, David. A Green Renaissance. In: Wild in London. Michael Joseph, London, 1986.
 Sands, Tim. Wildlife in Trust: a hundred years of nature conservation. The Wildlife Trusts, 2012. Pages 391–394.

External links
London Wildlife Trust: Gunnersbury Triangle
ChiswickW4: Chiswick Wildlife Group & Gunnersbury Triangle
Gunnersbury Triangle, VisitWoods website
Geograph: Gunnersbury Triangle in the snow
London Sound Survey: Dawn Chorus in May, Gunnersbury Triangle
Rural London: North Side: Gunnersbury Triangle

Local nature reserves in Greater London
Nature reserves in the London Borough of Ealing
Nature reserves in the London Borough of Hounslow
Parks and open spaces in the London Borough of Ealing
Parks and open spaces in the London Borough of Hounslow
Forests and woodlands of London
London Wildlife Trust
History of Middlesex